The Daily Caller is a right-wing news and opinion website based in Washington, D.C. It was founded by now-Fox News host Tucker Carlson and political pundit Neil Patel in 2010. Launched as a "conservative answer to The Huffington Post", The Daily Caller quadrupled its audience and became profitable by 2012, surpassing several rival websites by 2013. In 2020, the site was described by The New York Times as having been "a pioneer in online conservative journalism". The Daily Caller is a member of the White House press pool.

The Daily Caller has published false stories on multiple occasions, and declined to correct them when they were shown to be untrue. The website publishes false and misleading articles that contradict the scientific consensus on climate change. In 2017 and 2018, the website cut ties with an editor and two contributors linked to white supremacist causes. The website has responded to challenges to its stories in various ways, in some cases defending their claims, and in others expressing regret for story headlines or content; and on at least one occasion, when pointed out by other news outlets, the website has repudiated a past article writer due to support of extremist views.

In June 2020, Carlson left the site, with Patel buying out Carlson's stake to become majority owner. Foster Friess, a major conservative donor also known for being an investment manager, remained a partial owner until his death in 2021.

History 
The Daily Caller was founded by Tucker Carlson and Neil Patel. After raising $3 million in funding from businessman Foster Friess, the website was launched on January 11, 2010. The organization began with a reporting staff of 21 in its Washington office. It was launched as a "conservative answer to The Huffington Post", similarly featuring sections in broad range of subjects beyond politics. When The Daily Caller launched in 2010, it became the third Washington DC based news site besides Talking Points Memo and Politico.

In a 2010 interview with the Columbia Journalism Review, Tucker Carlson described The Daily Callers prospective audience as "[p]eople who are distrustful of conventional news organizations". Carlson said "the coverage of the Tea Party blows me away by its stupidity. The assumption of almost everyone I know who covers politics for the networks or daily newspapers is: they're all birthers, they're all crazy, they're upset about fluoride in the water, probably racist. And those assumptions have prevented good journalism from taking place".

By late 2012, the site had quadrupled its page view and total audience and had become profitable without ever buying an advertisement for itself.

Vince Coglianese replaced Carlson as editor-in-chief in 2016 when the Tucker Carlson Tonight show began on Fox. Carlson departed the site in June 2020 to increase his focus on his new show. Patel brought in Omeed Malik as a new partner; a former hedge fund managing director and Muslim American Democrat, he was a donor to Donald Trump. The Daily Caller became a minority-owned and -run company thereafter. Friess remained a partial owner until his death in 2021.

In 2020, The New York Times noted that "several former Daily Caller reporters occupy prominent roles in Washington journalism", specifically noting CNN White House correspondent Kaitlan Collins and Daily Mail reporter David Martosko.

Political stances 
When it first launched in January 2010, Mercedes Bunz, writing for The Guardian, said The Daily Caller was "setting itself up to be the conservative answer to The Huffington Post". According to Bunz, a year before the website launched, Carlson promoted it as "a new political website leaning more to the right than Politico and TalkingPointsMemo". However, at launch, he wrote a letter to readers that said it was not going to be a right-wing site. "We're not going to suck up to people in power, the way so many have", Carlson declared. During a January 2010 interview with Politico, Carlson said The Daily Caller was not going to be tied to his personal political ideologies and that he wanted it to be "breaking stories of importance". In a Washington Post article about The Daily Callers launch, Howard Kurtz wrote, "[Carlson's] partner is Neil Patel, a former Dick Cheney aide. His opinion editor is Moira Bagley, who spent 2008 as the Republican National Committee's press secretary. And his $3 million in funding comes from Wyoming financier Foster Friess, a big-time GOP donor. But Carlson insists this won't be a right-wing site". Kurtz quoted Carlson as saying, "We're not enforcing any kind of ideological orthodoxy on anyone". In an interview with The New York Times, Carlson said that the vast majority of traditional reporting comes from a liberal point of view and called  The Daily Callers reporting "the balance against the rest of the conventional press". In a 2012 Washingtonian article, Tom Bartlett said Carlson and Patel developed The Daily Caller as "a conservative news site in the mold of the liberal Huffington Post but with more firearms coverage and fewer nipple-slip slide shows".

In 2019, the Columbia Journalism Review described The Daily Caller as "right wing", a description also used by Business Insider, Snopes, and Harvard University's Berkman Klein Center for Internet & Society. According to The Guardian in April 2019, The Daily Caller was known for its pro-Trump content. In 2020, Austrian social scientist Christian Fuchs of the University of Westminster described The Daily Caller as an alt-right website. A 2021 Politico article, however, described The Daily Caller as being "mainstream right" in its positioning, as opposed to more "conspiratorial fringe" outlets such as One America News Network.

Journalistic standards
Fact-checkers have frequently debunked Daily Caller stories.
According to the 2018 book, Network Propaganda: Manipulation, Disinformation, and Radicalization in American Politics, written by Harvard University scholars Yochai Benkler, Robert Faris and Hal Roberts, The Daily Caller fails to follow journalistic norms in its reporting. According to the Encyclopædia Britannica, The Daily Caller "descended into extremism and sensationalism, publishing unsupported and frequently vulgar attacks on Democratic leaders, false criticisms of liberal causes, and popular conspiracy theories. The site also became known for its promotion of racist and sexist stereotypes".

Some scientific studies have identified The Daily Caller as a fake news website. In an October 2018 Simmons Research survey of 38 news organizations, The Daily Caller was ranked the least-trusted news organization by Americans, underneath Breitbart News, the Daily Kos, the Palmer Report, Occupy Democrats and InfoWars.

In 2019, The Daily Caller, along with One America News Network and The Gateway Pundit, were categorized as unreliable sources of information by the Wikipedia community, with the consensus being that The Daily Caller "publishes false or fabricated information".

Specific incidents
In 2011, The Daily Caller was the first news outlet to disseminate a Project Veritas video by conservative provocateur James O'Keefe which purportedly showed an NPR fundraiser deriding Republicans. The video was later proven to have been misleadingly edited. In February 2012, The Daily Caller was criticized for an "investigative series" of articles co-authored by Carlson, purporting to be an insiders' exposé of Media Matters for America (MMfA), a liberal watchdog group that monitors and scrutinizes conservative media outlets, and its founder David Brock. Citing "current and former" MMfA employees, "friends" of Brock's and a "prominent liberal", the article characterized MMfA as having "an atmosphere of tension and paranoia" and portrayed Brock as "erratic, unstable and disturbing", who "struggles with mental illness", in fear of "right-wing assassins", a regular cocaine user and would "close [local bars] and party till six in the morning". Reuters media critic and libertarian Jack Shafer criticized The Daily Caller piece as "anonymously sourced crap", adding "Daily Caller is attacking Media Matters with bad journalism and lame propaganda". Shafer said that he had "never thought much of Media Matters' style of watchdogging or Brock's journalism".

In August 2018, The Daily Caller ran a story alleging that a Chinese-owned company had hacked then-Secretary of State Hillary Clinton's private email server and successfully obtained nearly all of her emails, citing only, "two sources briefed on the matter". President Trump retweeted the allegations made in The Daily Callers unsubstantiated reporting. The FBI stated that there was no evidence to support the story. In January 2019, The Daily Caller published a story with the misleading headline, "Here's The Photo Some Described as a Nude Selfie of Alexandria Ocasio-Cortez". The photo was not of Congresswoman Ocasio-Cortez, and Ocasio-Cortez condemned The Daily Callers action as "completely disgusting behavior". The Daily Caller apologized for the headline and changed it. The Daily Caller said that the content of the story was not unlike stories published by Vice and The Huffington Post. Vice had in fact published an article debunking the claim that the photo was of Ocasio-Cortez.

Debunked prostitution allegations regarding Bob Menendez
In November 2012, The Daily Caller posted interviews with two women claiming that New Jersey Democratic Senator Bob Menendez had paid them for sex while he was a guest of a campaign donor. The allegation came five days before the 2012 United States Senate election in New Jersey.  News organizations such as ABC News, which had also interviewed the women, The New York Times, and the New York Post declined to publish the allegations, viewing them as unsubstantiated and lacking credibility. Subsequently, one of the women who accused Menendez stated that she had been paid to falsely implicate the senator and had never met him. Menendez's office described the allegations as "manufactured" by a right-wing blog as a politically motivated smear.

A few weeks later, police in the Dominican Republic announced that three women had claimed they were paid $300–425 each to lie about having had sex with Menendez, and alleged that the women had been paid to lie about Menendez by an individual claiming to work for The Daily Caller. The website denied this allegation, stating: "At no point did any money change hands between The Daily Caller and any sources or individuals connected with this investigation". Describing what it saw as the unraveling of The Daily Caller "scoop", the Poynter Institute wrote: "The Daily Caller stands by its reports, though apparently doesn't feel the need to prove its allegations right.

Debunked conspiracy theories about Imran Awan 
In February 2017 Politico and BuzzFeed reported Capitol Police accused five IT staffers for Democrats in the U.S. House of Representatives of trying to steal House computer equipment and violating House security policies. Congresswoman Debbie Wasserman Schultz was one of several House members who did not terminate the suspected staffers after the criminal complaints. In July 2017, one of the accused staffers, Imran Awan, was arrested for making a false statement on a bank loan application. After his arrest, Wasserman Schultz's office fired Awan.

The Daily Caller pushed conspiracy theories about Awan, seeking to tie Awan to many alleged criminal activities, including unauthorized access to government servers. The reporter behind the coverage of Awan told Fox News that the affair was "straight out of James Bond". An 18-month investigation by federal prosecutors found no evidence of wrongdoing in Awan's work in the House and no support for the conspiracy theories about Awan. In the announcement of the conclusion of the investigation, investigators rebuked a litany of right-wing conspiracy theories about Awan.

Climate change denial and false EPA stories 
The Daily Caller has published articles that dispute the scientific consensus on climate change. According to Science magazine, The Daily Callers "climate reporting focuses on doubt and highlights data that suggests climate concerns from the world's leading science agencies and organizations are incorrect". In 2011, the Daily Caller published a false story claiming that the United States Environmental Protection Agency (EPA) was going to spend $21 billion per year to hire 230,000 staff to regulate greenhouse gas emissions; at the time, the EPA had 17,000 staff and a total budget of $8.7 billion. The story went viral in right-wing media, and Republican politicians repeated the story. Other news outlets noted that the story was false, but The Daily Caller stood by the story. Adweek reported that the decision of David Martosko, executive editor at The Daily Caller, to stand by the story caused dismay among some the website's staff, who believed the decision undermined the credibility of the outlet.

In 2017, The Daily Caller published a story falsely claiming that a "peer-reviewed study" by "two scientists and a veteran statistician" found that recent years have not been the warmest ever. The alleged "study" was a PDF file on a WordPress blog, and was neither peer-reviewed nor published in a scientific journal. Also in 2017, The Daily Caller uncritically published a bogus Daily Mail story which claimed that the National Oceanic and Atmospheric Administration (NOAA) manipulated data to make climate change appear worse; at the same time, legitimate news outlets debunked the Daily Mail story, as did Media Matters. Also in 2017, The Daily Caller published a story claiming that a study found no evidence of accelerating temperatures over a 23-year period, which climate scientists described as a misleading story. In 2016, The Daily Caller published a story claiming that climate scientist Michael Mann (director of the Earth System Science Center at Pennsylvania State University) had asserted that data are unnecessary to measure climate change; Mann described the story as "egregiously false". In 2015, The Daily Caller wrote that NOAA "fiddle[d]" with data when the agency published a report concluding that there was no global warming hiatus.

In 2018, President Trump dismissed a National Climate Assessment report by the EPA about the impact of climate change in the United States, citing a Daily Caller story that the Obama Administration had pushed the authors of the report to focus on the worst-case scenario. FactCheck.org found no evidence for the claims made in The Daily Callers story, and that the EPA report focused both on lower and higher scenarios and largely looked at climate change impacts that had already occurred. FactCheck.org noted that the report underwent multiple reviews, both internally and externally, and that the report was available for public review for a period of three months. The Daily Caller cited as evidence for its claims a memo that allegedly showed that the Obama administration pushed the authors of the report to include worst-case scenarios; FactCheck.org noted the memo "does not show that the Obama administration pushed for certain scenarios".

Controversies
The Daily Caller has been involved in a several controversial incidents. In 2012, The Daily Caller reporter Neil Munro interrupted remarks by President Barack Obama during a press conference. Obama said, "The next time I prefer you let me finish my statements before you ask a question". Cutting off Munro's reply, Obama said, "I didn't ask for an argument." Munro's interruption of remarks by the president was widely considered a startling breach of etiquette. Editor-in-chief Tucker Carlson defended Munro's heckling, saying "As a general matter, reporters are there to ask [questions]" and that he was "proud" of Munro. In a statement, Munro claimed that his intention was to ask questions after the president made his remarks, and that he misjudged when the president was closing. "I timed the question believing the president was closing his remarks, because naturally I have no intention of interrupting the President of the United States. I know he rarely takes questions before walking away from the podium. When I asked the question as he finished his speech, he turned his back on the many reporters, and walked away while I and at least one other reporter asked questions".

In March 2015, The Daily Caller columnist Mickey Kaus quit after editor Tucker Carlson refused to run a column critical of Fox News coverage of the immigration policy debate. Carlson, who works for Fox News, reportedly did not want The Daily Caller publishing criticism of a firm that employed him.

In January 2017, The Daily Caller posted a video which encouraged violence against protesters. The footage showed a car driving into demonstrators, with the headline "Here's A Reel of Cars Plowing Through Protesters Trying to Block the Road". The video clip was set to a cover of the Ludacris song "Move Bitch". The video clip drew attention in August 2017 after a white supremacist murdered one counter-protestor and injured 35 more by intentionally driving a car into them at the Unite the Right rally in Charlottesville, Virginia. After the video attracted attention, The Daily Caller deleted it from its website.

In 2018, The Daily Caller was the first news outlet to report on Stefan Halper, a confidential FBI source, and his interactions with Trump campaign advisors Carter Page and George Papadopoulos. Papadopoulos later pleaded guilty to lying to the FBI about campaign matters. Page became the subject of surveillance warrants issued by the United States Foreign Intelligence Surveillance Court regarding contacts with Russian intelligence officials. Other news outlets confirmed Halper's identity but did not report his identity because US intelligence officials warned that it would endanger him and his contacts.

In 2020, during The Daily Caller's coverage of protests in Louisville, Kentucky related to the shooting of Breonna Taylor and subsequent verdict on the police involved, two of their reporters were arrested and held overnight. Co-founder Patel threatened to take legal action against the Louisville Metro Police Department, citing freedom of the press.

2016 presidential election conspiracy theories 

According to a study by Harvard University's Berkman Klein Center for Internet and Society, The Daily Caller was among the most popular right-wing news sites during the 2016 United States presidential election. The study also found that The Daily Caller provided "amplification and legitimation" for "the most extreme conspiracy sites", such as Truthfeed, InfoWars, The Gateway Pundit and Conservative Treehouse. The Daily Caller also "employed anti-immigrant narratives that echoed sentiments from the alt-right and white nationalists but without the explicitly racist and pro-segregation language".

In one of its most frequently shared stories, The Daily Caller falsely asserted that Morocco's King Mohammed VI flew Bill Clinton on a private jet, and that this had been omitted from the Clinton Foundation's tax disclosures. The Daily Caller also made the "utterly unsubstantiated and unsourced claim" that Hillary Clinton instructed Environmental Protection Agency head Lisa Jackson "to try to shut down Mosaic Fertilizer, described as America's largest phosphate mining company, in exchange for a $15 million donation to the Clinton Foundation from King Mohammed VI of Morocco, ostensibly to benefit Morocco's state-owned phosphate company".

2017 allegation of non-profit abuse 
According to Callum Borchers of The Washington Post, The Daily Caller has "a peculiar business structure that enables it to increase revenue while reducing its tax obligation". The organization, a for-profit company, does this by relying on its charity arm, The Daily Caller News Foundation, to create the majority of its news content.

Lisa Graves of the Center for Media and Democracy argues, "It's a huge rip-off for taxpayers if The Daily Caller News Foundation is receiving revenue that it doesn't pay taxes on, to produce stories that are used by the for-profit enterprise, which then makes money on the stories through ads". Benjamin M. Leff of American University writes, "But the fact that it also provides its content to other publishers for free is evidence that it is not operated for the private benefit of the for-profit, even if the for-profit is the dominant user of its content".

Ties to white supremacists in 2017–2018 
Scott Greer was deputy editor and contributor at The Daily Caller. After his departure in June 2018, it was revealed that he published articles espousing white nationalist, racist anti-black and antisemitic views under a pseudonym in white supremacist publications. In September 2018, The Atlantic reported that Greer between 2014 and 2018, had written pieces under a pseudonym "Michael McGregor" in the white supremacist publication Radix Journal from 2014 to 2015. In articles for Radix Journal, Greer expressed white nationalist views, as well as racist anti-black and antisemitic views. In his emails and messages, he exchanged anti-Christian and antisemitic comments, with colleagues including  Richard Spencer. After being confronted with his past white supremacist writings, Greer resigned from any affiliation with The Daily Caller. In 2017 it was revealed that Scott Greer had ties to members of the white nationalist movement, including friendships with Devin Saucier, assistant to Jared Taylor of American Renaissance, and anti-immigrant activist Marcus Epstein of VDARE, who had pled guilty to assaulting an African American woman two years prior to the beginning of his relationship with Greer. Greer had later deleted parts of his Facebook page, but is seen photographed with white nationalists such as Spencer, Tim Dionisopoulos, the Wolves of Vinland, and also appears wearing clothes belonging to the group Youth for Western Civilization. The Daily Caller itself subsequently stated about why he had not been fired in 2017: "We had two choices: Fire a young man because of some photos taken of him at metal shows in college, or take his word. We chose to trust him. Now, if what you allege is accurate, we know that trust was a mistake, we know he lied to us. We won't publish him, anyone in these circles, or anyone who thinks like them. People who associate with these losers have no business writing for our company".

Prior to June 2017, The Daily Caller had published freelance articles by Jason Kessler, a white supremacist who organized the Unite the Right rally in August 2017 in Charlottesville, Virginia. That rally took place while Kessler was suspended from The Daily Caller, after ProPublica had found that an article he had written for The Daily Caller about a previous torchlight rally in Charlottesville in May 2017 had not disclosed that he made a speech at the event praising fascist and racist groups. After the suspension, Daily Caller executive editor Paul Conner defended Kessler's article as accurate. The Daily Caller deleted all of Kessler's articles from its website in August 2017 after the Unite the Right rally, which he had organized with Spencer and others, turned into deadly violence.

Until 2017, the website had also published pieces by Peter Brimelow, founder of the white supremacist website VDARE, and by David Hilton, an anti-Semite who has pushed conspiracy theories that Israel was behind the 9/11 attacks. In his articles for The Daily Caller, Hilton promoted anti-Semitic conspiracy theories about George Soros, as well as conspiracy theories about "Cultural Marxism".

The Southern Poverty Law Center (SPLC) reported in 2017 that The Daily Caller had a "white nationalist problem", citing contributions by Kessler, Brimelow, Greer, and Ilana Mercer, whose writing on supposed racially motivated crime in South Africa was also published on the white nationalist website American Renaissance the same day it appeared in The Daily Caller. The SPLC retracted a claim about a Daily Caller reporter, Richard Pollock, stating that except for speaking at a 2017 event of the H.L. Mencken Club, considered a white nationalist group, "there is no evidence to suggest Mr. Pollock is otherwise a white nationalist"; in 2018, according to the SPLC, Pollock cancelled his scheduled attendance at the same group's event.

Staff, contributors and organization 

The Daily Caller is in the White House rotating press pool and has full-time reporters on Capitol Hill.

Contributors to The Daily Caller have included economist Larry Kudlow, Congressman Mark Sanford, former Speaker of the House Newt Gingrich, former US Senate Candidate and Judge Jeanine Pirro, sculptor Robert Mihaly, diplomat Alan Keyes, political commentator Ann Coulter, and the NRA-ILA. Content has also been contributed to the site by Lanny Davis, a former special counsel under Bill Clinton, and by political blogger Mickey Kaus, who quit in 2015.

The Daily Caller hosts The Mirror, a blog written by former FishbowlDC editor and The Hill columnist Betsy Rothstein. The Mirror covers media in Washington D.C., news related to journalism organizations, as well as political and media related gossip. The tagline is, "Reflections of a self-obsessed city".

Billionaire and businessman Charles Koch has made charitable donations to the Daily Caller News Foundation.

Check Your Fact subsidiary website
In 2017, The Daily Caller launched a for-profit subsidiary fact-checking website called Check Your Fact. In 2018, the site was approved by Poynter Institute's International Fact-Checking Network (IFCN) to become a fact-checking partner of Facebook in 2019. The website is editorially independent of The Daily Caller and has its own staff.

Awards 
2012 The Daily Caller won one of 99 Edward R. Murrow Awards issued by the Radio Television Digital News Association that year, for "Horse Soldiers of 9-11" a documentary by Alex Quade about the first US special forces troops who went into Afghanistan in 2001 on horseback. 
2012 American Legion Fourth Estate Award for "The Horse Soldiers of 9-11" by Alex Quade
2012 Telly Award for "The Horse Soldiers of 9-11" by Alex Quade

References

External links 
 
 Carlson launches rights' answer to Huff Post
 Letter from Tucker
 DC Trawler 
 CheckYourFact

2010 establishments in Washington, D.C.
American political blogs
American news websites
Internet properties established in 2010
Libertarianism in the United States
Tea Party movement
American conservative websites
Climate change denial